Stephen Cushing may refer to:
 Stephen B. Cushing (1812–1868), American lawyer and politician. 
 Stephen S. Cushing (1884–1957), Vermont attorney, businessman, judge, and politician